Children's Hospital and Institute of Child Health, established in May 1995, is a public children's hospital located on Ferozepur Road, Lahore, Punjab, Pakistan. The institution comes under Punjab Health Department.

History
In 1984, the idea of the building a child healthcare institute was presented in the annual meeting of Pakistan Paediatric Association. Although the construction of the hospital began in 1990, the outpatient department wasn't opened until May 1995. Whereas the emergency services began in October 1996 and inpatient services in December 1998.

The Children's Hospital and Institute of Child Health provides postgraduate training to a very large number of doctors in different disciplines as well as conducting research projects. The institute also encompasses the School of Nursing and School of Allied Health Sciences.

Professor Saeed-ul-Haque was the first project director of this hospital who initially conceived this idea and presented this idea to Former President of Pakistan General Zia-Ul-Haq to the Pakistan Paediatric Association in 1984.

Schools
Institute of Child Health
School of Nursing
Bachelor of Science in Nursing (BSN)
School of Allied Health Sciences
Doctor of Physical Therapy (DPT)
B.Sc in Dental Technology
B.Sc in Medical Imaging Technology
B.Sc in Medical Laboratory Technology
B.Sc in Occupational Therapy
B.Sc in Operation Theater Technology
B.Sc in Speech and Language Pathology

References

Hospital buildings completed in 1995
Hospitals in Lahore